Victor Vâlcovici ( – 21 June 1970) was a Romanian mechanician and mathematician.

Biography
Born into a modest family in Galați, he graduated first in his class in 1904 from Nicolae Bălcescu High School in Brăila. Entering the University of Bucharest on a scholarship, he attended its faculty of sciences, where he had as teachers Spiru Haret and Gheorghe Țițeica. After graduating in 1907 with a degree in mathematics, he taught high school for two years before leaving for University of Göttingen on another scholarship to pursue a doctorate in mathematics. He wrote his thesis  under the direction of Ludwig Prandtl and defended it in 1913; the thesis, titled Ueber die diskontinuierliche Flussigkeitsbewegungen mit zwei freien Strahlen (Discontinuous flow of liquids in two free dimensions), amplified upon the work of Bernhard Riemann.

He was subsequently named assistant professor of mechanics at the University of Iași, rising to full professor in 1918. In 1921, he became rector of the Polytechnic School of Timișoara. There, he was also professor of rational mechanics and founded a laboratory dedicated to the field. During his nine years as rector, he worked to place the recently founded university on a solid foundation. From 1930 until retiring in 1962, he taught experimental mechanics at the University of Bucharest. In the government of Nicolae Iorga, he served as Minister of Public Works from 1931 to 1932. During this time, he introduced a modern road network that featured paved highways. In 1936 he gave an invited talk at the International Congress of Mathematicians in Oslo, with title Sur le sillage derrière un obstacle circulaire (In the wake of a circular obstacle).

Elected a corresponding member of the Romanian Academy in 1936, he was stripped of his membership by the new communist regime in 1948, but made a titular member of the Romanian Academy in 1965. His numerous articles on theoretical and applied mechanics covered topics such as the principles of variational mechanics, the mechanics of ideal fluid flow, the theory of elasticity and astronomy.

He died in 1970 in Bucharest, and was buried in the city's Bellu Cemetery. Streets have been named after Victor Vâlcovici in Brăila, Galați, and Timișoara; a school in Galați also bears his name.

Books

Notes

References
Willi Hager, Hydraulicians in Europe (1800–2000), vol. 2. CRC Press, Boca Raton, Florida, 2009. 
 Eufrosina Otlăcan, "Victor Vâlcovici (1885–1970) – savant și desăvârșit pedagog", NOEMA, vol. VI, 2007, pp. 124–29

External links
 

1885 births
1970 deaths
People from Galați
University of Bucharest alumni
Mechanical engineers
20th-century Romanian mathematicians
Romanian schoolteachers
Academic staff of the University of Bucharest
Academic staff of Alexandru Ioan Cuza University
Academic staff of the Politehnica University of Timișoara
Rectors of Politehnica University of Timișoara
Titular members of the Romanian Academy
Romanian Ministers of Justice
Romanian Ministers of Public Works
Romanian Ministers of Communications
Romanian Ministers of Transport
Members of the Romanian Academy of Sciences
Aerodynamicists
Burials at Bellu Cemetery
Fluid dynamicists